Correcaminos de Colón is a Panamaian professional basketball team located in Colón, Panama. The team competes in the Liga Panameña de Baloncesto (LPB) and plays its home games at the Arena Panamá Al Brown, which has a capacity of 3,000 people. It has won a record four titles in the LPB, the last being in 2021. 

The Correcaminos have been active at the South American level too, having played in the 2016 and 2017 seasons of the FIBA Americas League. The team was proclaimed champion of the Championship of Clubs of Central America in 2016 when being first in the league.

Honours
Liga Panameña de Baloncesto
Champions (4): 2015, 2016, 2017, 2021

Current roster

Notable players

 Trevor Gaskins
 Ernesto Oglivie
 Alexander Galindo
 Tyler Gaskins

Head coaches
 Marcelo Signorelli

References

External links
FIBA Americas League profile
Presentation at Latinbasket.com

Basketball teams established in 2015
Basketball teams in Panama
Colón, Panama